David C. Pratt is an American businessman and philanthropist who from 2006 until bankruptcy in 2016, served as controlling owner, chairman and CEO of Gander Mountain, the largest U.S. retail network of outdoor specialty stores for shooting sports, hunting, fishing and camping.

Pratt, a former chairman and chief executive of pesticide maker United Industries Inc., in 1999 sold a controlling interest in United to Thomas H. Lee Partners for $620 million. United later was sold to the company now known as Spectrum Brands.

Pratt is a minority owner of the St. Louis Cardinals baseball team. In the Rocky Mountain West, Pratt is best known as the developer of Three Forks Ranch, a hunting and fishing resort.

Career 
Pratt's investment interest in the Gander Mountain chain began in the early 2000s. His Gander Mountain holdings reached 1.4 million shares by early 2005 and, in August of that year, a family trust supported the company with $20 million in cash in exchange for a debt note. In December 2006, the Pratt trust swapped the $20 million debt note and $30 million more in cash for more than 5.7 million additional shares. The deal made Pratt the company's largest shareholder and solidified his appointment as chairman the same month. As of 2016, Gander Mountain had 152 stores in 26 states. In March 2017, Gander Mountain voluntarily filed for Chapter 11 bankruptcy under a new owner, and decided to close 32 stores in 11 states. The company also began looking for a buyer. Store closures began in April with the affected stores holding inventory liquidation sales.

On May 1, 2017, Camping World Holdings, Inc., acquired Gander Mountain at auction for an estimated $35.4 million, pending approval by the federal bankruptcy court. As part of the deal, Camping World was obligated to operate a minimum of 17 Gander Mountain stores. Camping World executives stated that they would most likely retain and operate more stores. Most locations have been rebranded as Gander Outdoors.

In 1999, Pratt purchased the 200,000-acre Three Forks Ranch in northwest Colorado to raise cattle. He has since spent more than $100 million turning the ranch into a luxury hunting and fishing resort, Allison Pratt, Three Forks' marketing director, told Forbes magazine in 2010. “My father wanted to create something people would never expect in this corner of the world,” she said.

In 2003, Pratt gave a $6 million challenge grant to St. John's Mercy Medical Center in Creve Coeur, Mo., to  be used for the medical center's new cancer center. At the time, the gift was the largest in the medical center's 132-year history. The cancer center is called The David C. Pratt Cancer Center.

References 

Year of birth missing (living people)
Living people
Businesspeople from St. Louis
American businesspeople in retailing
American retail chief executives
American chemical industry businesspeople